Dietary diversity is the variety or the number of different food groups people eat over the time given. Many researchers might use the word ' dietary diversity' and ‘dietary variety’ interchangeably. However, some researchers differentiate the definition between 2 words that dietary diversity has defined as the difference of food groups while dietary variety has focused on the actual food items people intake.

Dietary diversity is related to nutrient intakes and is also an indicator of dietary quality. Moreover, dietary diversity associated with health outcomes such as being overweight  or an increased mortality .Dietary diversity is influenced by various determinants such as physical and mental health, economic status, or food environment.

References 

Eating behaviors of humans